The University of Bolton (or simply Bolton Institute; legally: The University of Bolton Higher Education Corporation) is a public university in Bolton, Greater Manchester, England. It has approximately 6,000 students and 700 academic and professional staff. Around 70% of its students come from Bolton and the North West region.

The university is a member of the North West Universities Association, Universities UK and Million+.

History

The University of Bolton traces its origins back to 1824 with the founding of Bolton Mechanics' Institute. In 1887, the Committee of the Mechanics' Institute decided that the town's apprentices required technical instruction for the rapidly expanding engineering advances being made at the turn of the nineteenth century. This resulted in the creation of the new Technical School with student numbers rising to more than 1,500.

In 1926, Bolton Technical School became a college. Fifteen years later a new building was opened offering a wide range of technical education choices, with engineering the most popular. In 1964, Bolton Technical College and Bolton Institute of Technology were divided into two separate organisations. A J Jenkinson was Principal of the Technical College, Bolton College of Education (Technical) and then the first Principal of Bolton Institute of Technology.

Bolton Institute of Higher Education was formed in 1982 by the merger of the Bolton Institute of Technology and Bolton College of Education. The first principal of BIHE was John McKenzie, who was succeeded by Bob Oxtoby. Oxtoby began the campaign for university status.

An £8.3 million extension project began in 1991 with the purchase of the former Eagle Factory. Bolton Institute was awarded the right to award taught degrees in 1992, with the powers to award research degrees in 1996. In 1998, Mollie Temple became the third principal and successfully led the institution to achieve university status in 2004.

In November 2014, it became the first university in the North West to become a Living Wage employer.

Campus
The university is primarily situated on an urban campus between Deane Road and Derby Street in Bolton. There are two halls of residence, although the university intends to relocate all services on to a single site in the centre of Bolton.
There is an academic centre in Ras Al Khaimah, United Arab Emirates.

Facilities

Senate House
Formally known as Deane Tower, Senate House underwent refurbishment in 2004 to become a centre for design disciplines, research and consultancy services.

The Chancellor's Building
Following the remodelling and centralisation of the University campus in 2007, a new £2.5 million Social Learning Zone for student study and Students' Union bar was built.
The building also houses the university library, student services and coffee shop.

Eagle Tower
The five-storey building houses subject areas such as Art & Design, Photography, Graphics, Media Studies, Special & Visual Effects and Psychology as well as academic offices.

Bolton One

The Bolton One facility is a £31 million, three-way partnership with Bolton Council and NHS Bolton situated on the university's campus. The university contributed around £7 million to the development. The purpose-built centre houses new health, science and sports teaching and research facilities – as well as a sports complex.

Halls of residence
The University has approved and recommends Orlando Village halls of residence, which is owned by McComb Bolton Limited.

Other accommodation is provided by private landlords. The "Cube" on Bradshawgate was one such building; it was seriously damaged by fire in November 2019.  Eyewitnesses say the cladding on the building encouraged the spread of the fire.  Manchester metro-mayor, Andy Burnham said, “It does have a type of cladding which does cause concern.  There will be many people living in buildings with this cladding today who will be very worried.”

University Collegiate School

UTC Bolton, a university technical college sponsored by the University of Bolton was established at the university campus in September 2015. In November 2015, the UTC was officially opened by Prince Edward, Earl of Wessex and named the 'Stoller Building' after the philanthropist Sir Norman Stoller. In September 2020 the school was renamed University Collegiate School. It is now a full secondary school sponsored by the university.

Growth and future plans

The university has also announced plans for a new £10m facility for Science and Engineering, which will house its Centre for Advanced Performance Engineering. Construction was set to begin following the completion of the UTC building in September 2015.

There was also to be a renovation and expansion of the current campus through to 2017.

In 2015, the university and Bolton Council announced plans for a new £40 million student village, which was planned to accommodate up to 850 students in the heart of Bolton town centre, facing the iconic Le Mans Crescent.

International presence

The University has an academic centre in Ras al-Khaimah in the United Arab Emirates and established international links with a number of overseas academic establishments in  China, Germany, Greece, Malawi, Malaysia and Singapore.

Since 2009, the University of Bolton has had a partnership with Western International College Ras Al Khaimah with programmes available at Undergraduate and Postgraduate level.
In December 2011, the University of Bolton launched its academic centre in Colombo, Sri Lanka, in partnership with the KES Group of Institutions...

Organisation and administration

Chancellors
 2010–2014: Patricia Morris, Baroness Morris of Bolton
 2014–2017: Sir Ernest Ryder
 2017–present: George Philip Nicholas Windsor, Earl of St Andrews

On 11 July 2016, the Board of Governors announced the appointment of Lord St. Andrews as Chancellor. The Earl commenced his responsibilities in January 2017.

Vice-Chancellors
 2005–present: George E Holmes

In February 2015, The Bolton News reported that the Vice-Chancellor George Holmes had been provided with a bridging loan of £960,000 from University funds to assist him in moving home.

Academic profile

Reputation and rankings

The Times stated in 2008 that "the university is not research-driven, but engineering, architecture and the built environment, social work and social policy all contained some 'world-leading' research in the 2008 assessments".

The Guardian ranked the University of Bolton in the top 50 universities in the United Kingdom in 2021 and within top 5 based on students' satisfaction with teaching.

Student life

The University of Bolton has a diverse student population. Around 13% of home students are from ethnic minority communities, with about 7% of its students being classed as international. This portion of students come from 70 countries outside the UK. The university also has a Chaplaincy that accommodates several different faiths.

Students' Union
The main Students' Union building is on Deane Road at the centre of the University Campus. As well as being home to the SU bar (The Vista) and the hub of many social events, the union provides numerous other roles, such as student support and advice (The Advice Unit), representation and sporting societies.

Sport
Bolton has many different sports teams competing in the BUCS leagues. Teams include: Basketball, Netball, Football, Hockey, Rugby League and Rugby Union.

Bolton One also offers students an eight-lane, 25-metre competition swimming pool, 50 foot climbing wall and sports hall.

Sponsorship
On 17 February 2016, it was announced that the University of Bolton would become the principal shirt sponsors of the Manchester Giants basketball team for the 2016 season. On 2 April 2016, the University of Bolton became again the sponsors of the Bolton Wanderers, in an agreement which was initially planned to last until Summer 2016.

See also
Armorial of UK universities
Alumni of the University of Bolton
Academics of the University of Bolton
College of Education
List of universities in the United Kingdom

References

External links

 
 Hackitt Report on Building regulations and fire safety (interim)

 
University of Bolton
1982 establishments in England
Buildings and structures in Bolton
Universities UK